Eric Clutton was an aircraft and aero-engine designer most noted for his FRED (Flying Runabout Experimental Design), a pioneering British homebuilt aircraft of the 1960s. During the 1970s, he worked on developing a geared version of the Volkswagen air-cooled engine for aircraft use, and the Clutton-Tabenor EC.2 (or "Easy Too"), a homebuilt sportsplane intended to showcase the potential of the new engine.

In the United States, he built a business out of designing model aircraft for radio control, and a line of diesel engines to power them under the name "Doctor Diesel", continuing his line of experimental model designs since his childhood in the UK.

References
 
 
 

English aerospace engineers
Year of birth missing
Year of death missing